Men in White is a 1933 play written by American playwright Sidney Kingsley. 
It was produced by the Group Theatre, Sidney Harmon and James Ramsey Ullman,
directed by Lee Strasberg with scenic design created by Mordecai Gorelik. It ran for 
351 performances from September 26, 1933 to July 28, 1934 at the Broadhurst Theatre. The play won the 1934 Pulitzer Prize for Drama.

It was included in Burns Mantle's The Best Plays of 1933–1934.

Cast

 Luther Adler as Dr. Gordon
 Alan Baxter as Dr. Crawford and as Mac
 Phoebe Brand as Barbara Dennin
 Morris Carnovsky as Dr. Levine
 J. Edward Bromberg as Dr. Hochberg
 Grover Burgess as Dr. McCabe
 William Challee as Dr. Michaelson
 Russell Collins as Dr. Cunningham
 Herbert Ratner as Dr. Vitale
 Walter Coy as Dr. Bradley and as Peter
 Robert Harper as Mr. Drummond
 Alexander Kirkland as Dr. Ferguson
 Bob Lewis as Dr. Otis and as Shorty
 Sanford Meisner as Dr. Wren and as Mr. Smith
 Ruth Nelson as Mrs. Smith
 Margaret Barker as Laura Hudson
 Mary Virginia Farmer as Mrs. D'Andrea
 Gerrit Kraber as James Mooney
 Lewis Leverett as	Mr. Spencer
 Clifford Odets as	Mr. Houghton
 Art Smith as Mr. Hudson
 Mab Maynard as Dorothy Smith
 Dorothy Patten as nurse Mary Ryan
 Eunice Stoddard as nurse Jamison
 Paula Miller as first nurse
 Elena Karam as second nurse
 Elia Kazan as orderly

Adaptations
The play was adapted for the 1934 Metro-Goldwyn-Mayer film Men in White, starring Clark Gable (Dr. Ferguson) and Myrna Loy (Laura Hudson).

References

External links

1953 Best Plays radio adaptation of play at Internet Archive
1947 Theatre Guild on the Air radio adaptation of play at Internet Archive
 (archive)

1933 plays
Broadway plays
Pulitzer Prize for Drama-winning works
Plays by Sidney Kingsley
Plays about abortion